Millwall Lionesses Football Club is an English women's football club based in Rotherhithe, south-east London, that plays in the London and South East Women's Regional Football League, the fifth tier of English women's football.

Founded in 1973, the group of women who made up the Lionesses were at first snubbed by Millwall FC but went on to become the first women's football team to affiliate to a professional men's team, Millwall F.C. who are nicknamed "The Lions". The Lionesses pioneered the now common "Football in the Community Scheme".

History
Millwall Lionesses remained an independent club in their initial years of existence. In the mid–1980s Millwall FC, who were trying to mitigate an appalling reputation for football hooliganism and racism, embraced the female club as part of their community project. Development officer Gary Stempel sourced funding from the Greater London Council (GLC) and then a combination of Lewisham and Greenwich Councils, as well as the Sports Council.

Millwall Lionesses became a leading force in both the women's game and the "Millwall Community Programme", and played an active part in the development of girls' football. Millwall Lionesses were the first club to have a female Centre of Excellence, of which there eventually became 42 in England. Millwall Lionesses field teams with an age range of eight, to thirty plus.

The former England women's national football team coach Hope Powell began her career with The Lionesses at the age of eleven, making her international debut at the age of 16.

The Lionesses won the FA Women's Cup in 1991 and 1997.

The Lionesses won promotion back to the FA Women's Premier League National Division in 2008–09, following an eight-year absence since their relegation in 2001.

In 2014 the Lionesses were founding members of the FA Women's Super League 2, the new 2nd tier of Women's football in England later renamed the FA Women's Championship.

In May 2019, shortly after the conclusion of the 2018–19 FA Women's Championship, it was announced that the Lionesses would split from Millwall F.C. forming a breakaway club named London City Lionesses. The FA Women's Championship licence was transferred to the new club. Millwall Lionesses would be operated through the Millwall Community Trust, whilst playing their football in the Eastern Region Women's League. Colin Reid was appointed as manager, with St Paul's Sports Ground in Rotherhithe confirmed as their home venue.

Players

References

External links
Lionesses' page at Millwall FC
Official website

Association football clubs established in 1972
Millwall F.C.
Women's football clubs in England
Women's football clubs in London
1972 establishments in England
Women's Championship (England) teams
FA Women's National League teams
Eastern Region Women's Football League teams